The 1972 South Australian National Football League season was the 93rd season of the top-level Australian rules football competition in South Australia.

Ladder

Finals Series

Grand Final

1972 Championship of Australia

References 

 https://web.archive.org/web/20141129184005/http://australianfootball.com/seasons/season/SANFL/1972

South Australian National Football League seasons
SANFL